The Nymore Bridge is a reinforced concrete deck arch bridge spanning the Mississippi River in Bemidji, Minnesota. The bridge, built in 1916, has three arch spans. It is significant for its use of a reinforcing system patented by George M. Cheney during a time when engineers were experimenting with reinforcing materials and systems.

The bridge was originally built to carry U.S. Route 2 (US 2) over the Mississippi River. The main city traffic is now carried by Minnesota State Highway 197 (MN 197), while US 2 now bypasses the city. The reinforcing system designed by George M. Cheney consists of an arched metal truss built of angles and gusset plates, separated into vertical panels, and then connected together. The metal truss was built first, then forms were constructed around it and concrete was poured around it. The steel truss becomes embedded in the concrete. The bridge is decorated with Classical Revival elements. The Classical Revival style was part of the City Beautiful movement popular at the time for civic structures. It connected Bemidji with the village of Nymore, which was later annexed into the city of Bemidji.

See also
 
 
 
 
 List of crossings of the Upper Mississippi River
 List of bridges on the National Register of Historic Places in Minnesota
 National Register of Historic Places listings in Beltrami County, Minnesota

References

Road bridges on the National Register of Historic Places in Minnesota
Neoclassical architecture in Minnesota
Bridges completed in 1917
Buildings and structures in Beltrami County, Minnesota
Transportation in Beltrami County, Minnesota
Concrete bridges in Minnesota
U.S. Route 2
National Register of Historic Places in Beltrami County, Minnesota
Arch bridges in the United States
Metal bridges in the United States
Bridges of the United States Numbered Highway System
1917 establishments in Minnesota
Bridges over the Mississippi River